Fife Lake is a lake in the Lower Peninsula of the U.S. state of Michigan. Located primarily in Fife Lake Township, Grand Traverse County, a small portion extends east into Springfield Township, Kalkaska County. The eponymous village of Fife Lake lies upon the lake's northern and western shores.

The lake and village are named for William H. Fife, a postmaster from Yuba, elsewhere in Grand Traverse County.

Fife Lake is part of the Manistee River watershed. Water from Fife Lake crosses south into Wexford County before encountering the Manistee River, where it flows west to Lake Michigan.

See also 

 List of lakes in Michigan

References 

Lakes of Michigan
Lakes of Grand Traverse County, Michigan
Lakes of Kalkaska County, Michigan